The Heart Research Institute (HRI) is a not-for-profit research facility, originally based in Camperdown, New South Wales, Australia and currently based in Newtown, New South Wales.

Established in 1989 through a joint initiative of the National Heart Foundation of Australia, the cardiologists of Royal Prince Alfred Hospital, the Government of Australia, and Government of New South Wales, the Institute has become a research and research training facility, in particular in investigating the disease atherosclerosis.

History
In September 2009, the Institute relocated from its Camperdown, New South Wales site to its present site in Newtown, New South Wales. The Institute was opened by Quentin Bryce AC, the Governor-General of Australia.

Location and facilities
The HRI, currently located within a purpose-built building on 7 Eliza Street, Newtown, New South Wales, is closely located to the Royal Prince Alfred Hospital and the University of Sydney.

The HRI has state-of-the-art research laboratories and support facilities.

Notable people

Chairman of the Board
 Prof. Leonard Kritharides

Clinical Director
Prof. David Celermajer

Director of Cardiovascular Research 
 Prof. Shaun Jackson

Group Leaders
 Prof. David Celermajer – Clinical Research Group
 Prof. Ben Freedman – Heart Rhythm and Stroke Prevention Group
 Prof. Stuart Grieve – Cardiac Imaging Group
 Prof Annemarie Hennessy – Vascular Immunology Group
 Prof. Shaun Jackson – Thrombosis Group
 Dr Mary Kavurma – Vascular Complications Group
 Dr John O'Sullivan – Cardiometabolic Disease Group
 A/Prof. Sanjay Patel – Cell Therapeutics Group
 Dr Anna Waterhouse – Cardiovascular Medical Devices Group

See also

Health in Australia
Cardiovascular disease in Australia

References

External links

1989 establishments in Australia
Heart disease organizations
Medical research institutes in Sydney
Research institutes established in 1989
Sydney Medical School